The Upstate is the region in the westernmost part of South Carolina, United States, also known as the Upcountry, which is the historical term. Although loosely defined among locals, the general definition includes the 10 counties of the commerce-rich I-85 corridor in the northwest corner of South Carolina. This definition coincided with the Greenville–Spartanburg–Anderson, SC combined statistical area, as first defined by the Office of Management and Budget (OMB) in 2015.  In 2018, the OMB redefined the CSA such that it no longer included Abbeville County.  That definition remains as of 2020. 

The region's population was 1,347,112 as of 2016. Situated between Atlanta and Charlotte, the Upstate is the geographical center of the Charlanta megaregion. After BMW's initial investment, foreign companies, including others from Germany, have a substantial presence in the Upstate; several large corporations have established regional, national, or continental headquarters in the area. Greenville is the largest city in the region with a population of 72,227 and an urban-area population of 400,492, and it is the base of most commercial activity. Spartanburg and Anderson are next in population.

Counties 
Ten counties are included in the Upstate of South Carolina: Greenville, Spartanburg, Anderson, Pickens, Oconee, Greenwood, Laurens, Cherokee, Union, Abbeville.

Metropolitan, micropolitan, and combined statistical areas 
As of 2018, the Greenville–Spartanburg–Anderson CSA includes all counties in the Upstate except for Abbeville County.  Within the CSA are a total of two metropolitan statistical areas and four micropolitan statistical areas.

As of the 2010 Census, the Greenville–Spartanburg–Anderson CSA had a population of 1,362,073.

Communities 
The following population rankings are based on the 2010 Census.

Primary cities 
Greenville, Spartanburg, and Anderson

The OMB labels all these cities as principal cities in their respective MSAs.

Other communities with at least 20,000 residents 
Cities: Greenwood, Greer, Easley, Simpsonville  and Mauldin

CDPs: Taylors, Wade Hampton

Communities with more than 10,000 residents 
Cities: Clemson, Gaffney, and Fountain Inn, South Carolina.

If students from Clemson University are included, Clemson has close to 30,000 residents.

CDP's: Berea, Five Forks, Gantt, Parker, Boiling Springs

Communities with fewer than 10,000 residents 
Communities in the Upstate with under 10,000 residents include:

Cities:

Towns:
 

According to the 2010 Census, no town in the Upstate has a population greater than 6000.

CDPs:

Institutions of higher education 

The following table shows the major institutions of higher education in the Upstate.

In 2008, U.S. News ranked Furman as the 37th-best liberal arts college, Wofford College as the 59th-best, and Presbyterian College as the 101st-best. Also, they ranked Clemson University as the 67th-best national university. According to the Bob Jones University, its Museum and Gallery constitutes the largest collection of religious art in the Western Hemisphere.

Economy 
The majority of business and commerce in the Upstate takes place in Greenville County.  Greenville has the largest concentration of businesses and financial institutions in its downtown area.  In fact, the Greenville-Spartanburg-Anderson MSA was ranked seventh in the nation by site consultants considering the top markets for economic development.  Many financial institutions have regional offices located in downtown Greenville. These include Bank of America and the now-defunct Wachovia.  Other major industries of commerce in the Upstate include the auto industry, which is concentrated mainly along the corridor between Greenville and Spartanburg around the BMW manufacturing facility in Greer.  

The other major industry in the Upstate is the healthcare and pharmaceuticals.  Greenville Hospital System and Bon Secours St. Francis Health System are the area's largest in the healthcare sector, while the pharmaceutical corporation of Bausch & Lomb has set up regional operations alongside smaller recently developed local companies such as IRIX Manufacturing and Pharmaceutical Associates.  The Upstate is also home to a large number of private-sector and university-based research including R&D facilities for Michelin, Fuji, and General Electric and research centers to support the automotive, life sciences, plastics, and photonics industries. Clemson University, BMW, IBM, Microsoft, and Michelin have combined their resources to create Clemson University International Center for Automotive Research, a research park that specializes in the development of automotive technology.

Corporations based in or with a major presence in the Upstate 
These corporations have a major presence in the Upstate: Adidas, Advance America, Bank of America, BMW of North America, Bon Secours St. Francis Health System , Bosch North America, Denny's Restaurants, Dunlop Sport, Ernst & Young, Fluor Corporation, Freightliner, GE Power Systems, Prisma Health , IBM, Kemet Corporation, Liberty Corporation, Spartanburg Regional Healthcare System, Michelin of North America, Microsoft, Milliken & Company,  Spartanburg Regional Health System, Spectrum Communications, SunTrust, Ovation Brands, Perrigo Company of South Carolina, Techtronic Industries, Toronto-Dominion Bank, and Verizon.

• BMW's only North American manufacturing plant is located in Spartanburg County, with an investment of $3.7 billion.

• Fujifilm located their first manufacturing facility in the U.S. in Greenwood County.

• Michelin North America's headquarters is located in Greenville, along with seven manufacturing plants, R&D facility, and test track located in the Upstate. Michelin employs more than 7,800 in South Carolina.

• Walgreens has their southeastern distribution center located in Anderson County, which employs mentally disabled workers as nearly 40% of their workforce.

Transportation 

The Upstate is served by two major interstate highways, I-85 and I-26. Other major interstate spurs include I-185, I-385, and I-585. The major airport in the region is Greenville-Spartanburg International Airport, located nearly halfway between Greenville and Spartanburg in suburban Greer. Greenville, Spartanburg, Anderson, Clemson, Pickens, Union, and Gaffney each have smaller airfields. Amtrak service along the Crescent Line stops in Spartanburg, Greenville, and Clemson.

Media 
The Upstate region is served by three regional newspapers: The Greenville News, the (Spartanburg) Herald-Journal, and the Anderson Independent-Mail, each of which serves its individual city and surrounding area.

The Upstate is part of the vastly larger Greenville-Spartanburg-Anderson-Asheville designated market area, which extends into western North Carolina and northeastern Georgia. These television stations serve the region:
 WYFF Channel 4 – Greenville (NBC)
 WSPA-TV Channel 7 – Spartanburg (CBS)
 WLOS-TV Channel 13 – Asheville, North Carolina (ABC)
 WGGS-TV Channel 16 – Greenville (TBN)
 WHNS Channel 21 – Greenville (Fox)
 WNTV Channel 29 – Greenville (SCETV)
 WUNF-TV Channel 33 – Asheville (UNC-TV)
 WMYA-TV Channel 40 – Anderson (MNTV)
 WYCW Channel 62 – Asheville (CW)

See also 
 Piedmont Atlantic
 SC-NC-VA Tornado Outbreak
 List of Appalachian Regional Commission counties#South Carolina
 South Carolina Lowcountry
 Midlands of South Carolina

References

External links 

 The Upcountry website – Six Upstate counties form the "Upcountry" tourism region
 South Carolina Appalachian Council of Governments – This council of governments covers the "Upcountry" counties.
 Old 96 Distrist – Three Upstate counties form a part of the Old 96 District tourism region.
 Union County is one of the seven counties in the Olde English District.
 Ten at the Top – A nonprofit organization promoting a shared vision between the political, business and community leaders of the Upstate
 The Greenville News – local newspaper of Greenville
 (Spartanburg) Herald Journal – local newspaper of Spartanburg
 Anderson Independent-Mail – local newspaper of Anderson
 Greenville Journal – a weekly newspaper
 Upstate International - Global Community of the Upstate

 
Geography of Abbeville County, South Carolina
Geography of Anderson County, South Carolina
Geography of Cherokee County, South Carolina
Geography of Greenville County, South Carolina
Geography of Greenwood County, South Carolina
Geography of Oconee County, South Carolina
Geography of Laurens County, South Carolina
Geography of Pickens County, South Carolina
Geography of Spartanburg County, South Carolina
Geography of Union County, South Carolina
Geography of Appalachia
Regions of South Carolina